is a 13-episode television anime series based on the Aquarian Age collectible card game. The show was co-produced by Broccoli and Madhouse and aired in early 2002 on TV Tokyo. ADV Films released the show in the United States on DVD in three volumes containing both English subtitled and dubbed versions. A trailer for a live action movie was released in 2008. The Aquarian Age: Juvenile Orion movie was released on March 29, 2008.

Plot
The story centers on high school student and band vocalist Kamikurata Kyouta, and how he stumbles on a secret war being waged by mysterious girls with otherworldly powers. Kyouta later forms a band named T.L. Signal with his friends Kojima Junichi and Hirota Shingo. Kyouta's band works for a company named CosmoPop. Junichi plays the keyboard and Shingo is the guitarist of the band. Things grow even more complicated when he discovers his girlfriend Sannou Yoriko might be the key to the war.

Media

Manga 
The stand-alone manga Juvenile Orion occurs in the broader Aquarian Age universe, but is unrelated to Aquarian Age: Sign for Evolution.

Anime

Music
The background music is composed by Yuki Kajiura, also known for the background music from Noir and the second and third episodes of the Xenosaga game trilogy. The 2008 live-action film's main theme is Mirror Ball by Japanese rock group Alice Nine.

References

External links
 
 ADV English Cast list
 Aquarion Age the Movie Cast Announcement

2002 anime television series debuts
2003 anime OVAs
Anime composed by Yuki Kajiura
Science fiction anime and manga
ADV Films
Madhouse (company)
Madhouse (company) franchises
Yuki Kajiura